The Lead is the debut extended play by English girl group Flo, released on July 8, 2022 through Island Records. The EP features with three singles: "Cardboard Box", "Immature" and "Summertime".

The debut extended play was produced by MNEK, except "Another Guy (Acoustic)". On 14 September 2022, the English trio re-released the extended play which served as a deluxe, with a promotional single: "Not My Job".

Background 
"Cardboard Box" was first released on 24 March 2022, by the English trio and acted as the trio's debut single. Later on, this single also acted as the lead single for their extended play. The debut song was produced by English producer, MNEK. An accompanying music video was published to YouTube on 1 April 2022, which surpassed 900 thousand views within days. Many established artists, such as SZA and Missy Elliott praised the song on social media. The trio described the song as "getting yourself together after a breakup". On 6 May 2022, an acoustic version of this single was released.

"Immature" acted as their second single which was released on 6 July 2022. Pitchfork described the trio's vocals as "an icy edge, while the trio's golden harmonies at the bridge keep things crisp." A music video for this single was released on the same day as the EP. The trio performed both singles live for Vevo DSCVR on 5 August 2022. 

The same day where their second was released, the English trio announced their debut extended play. The EP was released on 8 July 2022, with a total of five tracks. MNEK produced four out of the five songs featured in the EP. In September 2022, the trio re-released the extended play with an additional track, named "Not My Job", which was released as a promotional single.

Critical reception 
The EP received positive reviews from critics. Complex called it "an essential listen". Hype Magazine noted that the EP represents a revival of girl group sounds in the British R&B scene, which have not been heard for many years, with Nylon making a similar assessment. Rolling Stone predicted that the EP would vault Flo to stardom. MuuMuse noted that the EP displays the confidence and authority of a long-establish star act, despite being Flo's first full release. The EP also received positive reviews from The Honey Pop, 360, and Soul Bounce.

Track listing 
Credits adapted from Tidal and Genius.

Notes

  signifies an additional producer
  signifies a co-producer

Personnel 
Credits adapted from Genius.

Musicians 

 Jorja Douglas – vocals 
 Renée Downer – vocals 
 Stella Quaresma – vocals

Production 

 Uzoechi Emenike – producer 
 Jamal Woon – producer 
 Joe Gossling – producer 
 RELYT – producer 
 Maths Time Joy – producer 
 LOXE – producer 
 Joe Hartwell Jones – producer

Release history

References 

Flo (group) albums
2022 debut EPs